Berkay Vardar (14 January 2003) is a Turkish professional footballer who currently plays at Süper Lig side Beşiktaş.

Career
Vardar made his senior debut in match week 2 of Group C at 2021–22 UEFA Champions League, against Ajax as a substitute player, replacing Umut Meraş on 73rd minute, ended 2–0 for Ajax, on 28 September 2021. On 22 April 2022, Vardar signed his first professional contract with Beşiktaş until 2025.

International career
Vardar was born in Istanbul, Turkey to Albanian father from Kumanovo and Azerbaijani mother. He was eligible to represent three countries on international level, either Azerbaijan, North Macedonia or Turkey. From 2019, until 2021, Vardar has been part of Azerbaijan at youth international level, respectively has been part of the U17 and U19 teams and he with these teams played six matches and scored two goals. On 16 September 2022, he received a call-up from Turkey U21 for the friendly match against Georgia U21, and made his debut after coming on as a substitute at 46th minute in place of Ömer Faruk Beyaz.

Statistics

Club

References

External links
 

2003 births
Living people
Footballers from Istanbul
Turkish footballers
Turkey under-21 international footballers
Azerbaijani footballers
Azerbaijan youth international footballers
Turkish people of Azerbaijani descent
Turkish people of Albanian descent
Azerbaijani people of Albanian descent
Association football midfielders
Beşiktaş J.K. footballers
Süper Lig players